Zhiryatinsky District is an administrative and municipal district (raion), one of the twenty-seven in Bryansk Oblast, Russia. It is located in the center of the oblast. Its administrative center is the rural locality (a selo) of Zhiryatino. Population:   8,207 (2002 Census);  The population of Zhiryatino accounts for 34.1% of the district's population.

References

Notes

Sources

Districts of Bryansk Oblast